Georg Hartmann (sometimes spelled Hartman; February 9, 1489 – April 9, 1564) was a German engineer, instrument maker, author, printer, humanist, priest, and astronomer.

Early life and studies 
Hartmann was born in Eggolsheim near Forchheim, present-day Bavaria.  At the age of 17, he began studying theology and mathematics at the University of Cologne. After finishing his studies, he traveled through Italy, staying in Rome for a few years, and finally settled in Nuremberg in 1518.

Career 
After his days studying at Cologne, Hartmann went to Rome to continue his studies where he was friends with Andreas Copernicus, brother to Nicholas Copernicus. While in Nuremberg, Hartmann served as vicar of the St. Sebald church from his arrival in 1518 until 1544. He constructed astrolabes, globes, sundials, and quadrants during his time in Nuremberg. Georg Hartmann designed and manufactured many different types of instruments in his workshop. Different types of dials manufactured by Hartmann included Block dials, Declining dials, Shepherd's dials, Moon dials, Chalice dials, and Cylinder dials. Along with these dials Hartmann was known for his design and manufacture of brass Astrolabes. Hartmann kept a very detailed self-written manual in German describing how to manufacture his sundials and astrolabes which was translated into English by John Lamprey in his book "Hartmann's Practika", published in 2002. Hartmann is credited with being the first person to design refractive sundials in the Sixteenth century. Hartmann was always a tinkerer and had a deep fascination with mechanics, horology, instrumentation, and natural phenomenon. While he used this knowledge to make a living creating numerous different instruments during his life, Hartmann was a priest by vocation with several benefices which allowed by to continue his work and studies without a real need of making a living. In addition to these traditional scientific instruments Hartmann also made gunner's levels and sights. Hartmann was possibly the first to discover the inclination of Earth's magnetic field. Hartmann was a known student in the study of magnetism, with his discovery that a compass does not always point to true north. He discovered that while in Rome a compass would dip 6° off of true north. With this discovery he attempted to find the mathematical reason why this was the case, but his solution to this phenomenon was eventually found to be flawed. This discovery by Hartmann however was not published and the only record of this was a letter he sent to Duke Albert of Prussia. This letter was not public knowledge until almost three centuries later in 1831 when it was finally printed, and as such his work with magnetism was not able to be studied or influenced others in this era. He died in Nuremberg in 1564.

Hartmann's 1537 batch of astrolabes for the 39° latitude plate were found to be inaccurate, having the almucantars spaced out too far. Of the four astrolabes in that production run, all of them had these errors. This led to the conclusion that it was a simple human error, and shown a light on the amount of work that went into each of these instruments. Following the discovery of these errors, a deeper look went into Hartmann's manufacturing methods.

Writings 
His two published works were Perspectiva Communis (Nuremberg, 1542), a reprint of John Peckham's 1292 book on optics and Directorium (Nuremberg, 1554), a book on astrology. He also left Collectanea mathematica praeprimis gnomonicam spectania, 151 f. MS Vienna, Österreichische Nationalbibliothek, Quarto, Saec. 16 (1527–1528), an unpublished work on sundials and astrolabes that was translated by John Lamprey and published under the title of Hartmann's Practika in 2002.

Museum holdings 
Some of Hartmann's instruments are held by museums, such as the Adler Planetarium in Chicago, Harvard University, The National Museum of American History at the Smithsonian Institution in Washington D.C., and Yale University in the History of Science Museum. In England, some instruments can be seen at The British Museum, the National Museum of Science and Industry, and the National Maritime Museum Greenwich in London; as well as the Museum of the History of Science in Oxford. In Germany, Hartmann's instruments can be seen on display at the Germanisches Nationalmuseum in Nuremberg, Kunstgewerbemuseum in Berlin, Museum fur Angewandte Kunst in Cologn, Staatlicher Mathematisc-Physikalischer Salon in Dresden, and the Kestner-Museum in Hannover. Some of Hartmann's astrolabes can be seen on display in France at the Bibliotheque Nationale in Paris and the Musee National de la Renaissance in Ecouen. In the Netherlands astrolabes manufactured by Hartmann can be seen on display at the Museum Boerhaave in Leiden and the Utrecht University Museum in Utrecht. Other museums in Europe where some of Hartmann's are on display include the Kunsthistorisches Museum in Vienna, Musee de la Vie Wallone in Luttich, Belgium, Nationalmuseet in Copenhagen, Denmark, Museo di Storia della Scienza in Florence, Italy, and the St. Paul Stiftsgymnasium.

See also
History of geomagnetism

References 

7. Constanze Lindner Haigis, Dieter Nievergelt: Der frühese Modellbaubogen. Ein Sonnenuhr-Kruzifix von Georg Hartmann (1489–1564) aus Nürnberg. In: Arbeitskreis Bild Druck Papier. Tagungsband Ravenna 2006. Münster 2007, S. 11-36.

16th-century German astronomers
German geophysicists
German scientific instrument makers
1564 deaths
1489 births
People from Forchheim (district)